Wang Zhen'ao (born 10 August 1999) is a Chinese footballer currently playing as a forward for Chinese Super League side Dalian Pro.

Club career
Wang Zhen'ao joined Beijing Wanda and was loaned to Wanda Group's related club Atlético Madrid for youth training in 2012. He refused to sign a professional contract with Wanda in the summer of 2017. He would instead join Danish 1st Division side Vejle Boldklub on 5 January 2018. Wang would be promoted to their senior team and was part of the squad that won and gained promotion at the end of the 2017–18 Danish 1st Division season. He would make his professional debut the following season in a league game on 23 November 2018 against AaB Fodbold in a 1-1 draw.

On 26 February 2020, Wang reached agreement with Wanda Group and resolved his previous contract dispute with them to join Wanda owned Dalian Pro in the 2020 Chinese Super League. He would go on to make his debut in a Chinese FA Cup game on 18 September 2020 against Shandong Luneng Taishan in a 4-0 defeat. His league debut would soon follow on 27 September 2020 against Guangzhou Evergrande Taobao in a 1-0 defeat.

Career statistics

References

External links

1999 births
Living people
Footballers from Wuhan
Chinese footballers
Chinese expatriate footballers
Association football forwards
Danish Superliga players
Vejle Boldklub players
Chinese expatriate sportspeople in Denmark
Expatriate men's footballers in Denmark
21st-century Chinese people